Centronycteris is a genus of sac-winged bats. It contains two species:

Thomas's shaggy bat (C. centralis)
Shaggy bat (C. maximiliani)

References

 
Bat genera
Taxa named by John Edward Gray